Murexsul cuspidatus is a species of sea snail, a marine gastropod mollusk in the family Muricidae, the murex snails or rock snails.

Description

Distribution
This marine species occurs off Japan.

References

 Sowerby, G.B. II, 1879 – Murex. In: Thesaurus conchyliorum or genera of shells, vol. 4, p. 55 p, 24 pls

Muricidae
Gastropods described in 1879